The Liberian blind snake (Afrotyphlops liberiensis) is a species of snake in the Typhlopidae family.

References 

Afrotyphlops
Reptiles described in 1848